Away from Home  (Turkish:Herkes Kendi Evinde) is a 2001 Turkish drama film  directed by Semih Kaplanoğlu. The film won 6 awards including at the Ankara International Film Festival and Istanbul International Film Festival.

Cast
Tolga Çevik as  Selim 
Erol Keskin as  Nasuhi 
Anna Bielska as Olga 
Yalçın Akçay   
Şükran Güngör  
Devrim Parscan   
Cüneyt Türel

External links 

2001 films
2001 drama films
Films directed by Semih Kaplanoğlu
Films set in Turkey
Turkish drama films
2000s Turkish-language films